Joy Crizildaa is an Indian fashion costume designer and entrepreneur, who works in the Kollywood industry. She married director JJ Fredrick in 2018.

Career 
She pursued her early career as an assistant director while working as an intern with Star Vijay. She also founded an Indian fashion design brand "Signature" in 2014. She made her film debut as a costume designer in Rajathandhiram. She became best known for designing the costumes for the film Jilla.

Filmography 

 Jilla (2014)
 Rajathandhiram (2015)
 Darling (2015)
 Rekka (2016)
 Miruthan (2016)
 Velainu Vandhutta Vellaikaaran (2016)
 Hara Hara Mahadevaki (2017)
 Velaikkaran (2017)
 Bruce Lee (2017)
 Silukkuvarupatti Singam (2018)
 Ulkuthu (2017)
 Enakku Innoru Per Irukku (2016)
 Katha Nayagan (2017)
 Richie (2016)
 Kanithan (2016)

References 

Living people
Indian women fashion designers
Indian costume designers
Artists from Tamil Nadu
Year of birth missing (living people)